Alexander James Quinn (April 8, 1932 – October 18, 2013) was a bishop of the Catholic Church in the United States.  He served as an auxiliary bishop of the  Diocese of Cleveland in the state of Ohio from 1983 until 2008.

Biography
Quinn was born in Cleveland to Alexander J. and Mary (Garvey) Quinn, and he was ordained a priest for the Diocese of Cleveland on May 24, 1958. He was educated at Saint Ignatius High School (Cleveland), St. Charles College in Cantonsville, Maryland, St. Mary's Seminary in Cleveland, the Lateran University in Rome, and Cleveland State University. Quinn earned both a Doctor of Canon Law and Juris Doctor degrees. 

On October 14, 1983, Pope John Paul II named him Titular Bishop of Socia and Auxiliary Bishop of Cleveland. He was consecrated by Bishop Anthony Pilla of Cleveland on December 5, 1983. The principal co-consecrators were Archbishop Daniel Pilarczyk of Cincinnati and Auxiliary Bishop Gilbert Sheldon of Cleveland.  Bishop Quinn served the diocese as an auxiliary and as the vicar for the western region of the diocese for 24 years.  Pope Benedict XVI accepted his resignation on June 14, 2008, and he took up residence at St. Ladislas parish in Westlake.  He died there of natural causes on October 18, 2013, at the age of 81.  After his funeral at the Cathedral of St. John the Evangelist, he was laid to rest at Calvary Cemetery in Cleveland.

References

1932 births
2013 deaths
Religious leaders from Cleveland
Roman Catholic Diocese of Cleveland
Saint Mary Seminary and Graduate School of Theology alumni
Cleveland State University alumni
20th-century American Roman Catholic titular bishops
21st-century American Roman Catholic titular bishops